Cefoselis is a fourth generation cephalosporin. It is used extensively in Japan and China in the clinical treatment of various gram positive and gram negative infections. A 2014 study illustrated that Cefoselis is effective at treating respiratory and urinary tract infections.

References

Pyrazoles
Thiazoles
Cephalosporin antibiotics